Lin Ma Hang is a village in the Sha Tau Kok area of Hong Kong and is situated north of the New Territories, next to the Shenzhen river, east of Heung Yuen Wai and west of Hung Fa Leng.

Administration
Lin Ma Hang is a recognized village under the New Territories Small House Policy. It is one of the villages represented within the Ta Kwu Ling District Rural Committee. For electoral purposes, Lin Ma Hang is part of the Sha Ta constituency, which is currently represented by Ko Wai-kei.

History

People originated in the village are the Yip (葉) (or Ip, Yap, Yapp), Lau (劉), Sin (冼) and Koon (官) (or Kwun). It is named after a fruit called Lin Ma (蓮麻) that can be found in the mid-level streams.

Lin Ma Hang is part of the Four Yeuk, which comprises Loi Tung, Lung Yeuk Tau, Lin Ma Hang and Tan Chuk Hang. The centre of the Alliance is the Hung Shing Temple at Hung Leng.

At the time of the 1911 census, the population of Lin Ma Hang was 516. The number of males was 199.

Abandoned lead mine

A lead mine was in operation in Lin Ma Hang starting in 1915. Pb–Zn ore was mined there. The mine operated intermittently between 1915 and 1958, producing 16,000 tonnes of lead metal and 360,000 ounces of silver. The Government rescinded the mining lease in 1962 and the mine was abandoned the same year.

Fauna and flora
The abandoned lead mine now holds one of the most important bat colonies in Hong Kong, and was designated as a Site of Special Scientific Interest (SSSI) in 1994.

The Lin Ma Hang Stream was designated as a SSSI in 2008. It supports 17 species of primary freshwater fish, representing 50% of all such species native to Hong Kong.

The village is situated in the basin of the Robin's Nest which is famous for its abundance in "Hanging Bell Flowers" (吊鐘花).

Building heritage

 The Residence of Ip Ting-sz is a declared monument
 Old Bridge, Grade 3 historic building
 Ip Ancestral Hall, Grade 3 historic building
 Koon Ancestral Hall, Grade 3 historic building
 Kwan Tai Temple, not graded
 Lau Ancestral Hall, not graded
 MacIntosh Fort on Kong Shan above Lin Ma Han, Grade 2 historic building

Access
Until 4 January 2016, the village was situated in the Frontier Closed Area and was therefore inaccessible to non-permit holders. 

Since 4 January 2016, the village was excluded from the Frontier Closed Area. Nonetheless, a portion of Lin Ma Hang Road, the access road to the village, between Wang Lek and Lin Ma Hang, still falls within the closed area. Therefore, permits are still required for anyone visiting the village by road to travel on this section of road.    Green Minibus 59K from Sheung Shui Station operates to Lin Ma Hang.  Passengers for Lin Ma Hang must have a closed area permit, or are required to alight at Wang Lek.

A path (rough and with short steep sections in parts) parallel to the road outside the closed area has been built to allow non-permit holders to access or leave the village on foot.  

The village may also be accessed by hiking down from Robin's Nest.

International Bridge
There is also a small bridge, called the "international bridge" (國際橋）that crosses into Mainland China to allow local villagers on both sides of the border to cross and farm lots.  It is located just outside the gate from the village to Lin Ma Hang Road. People using the bridge must have a special "Cross Border Farming Permit".  The Mainland border post can be seen from the gate.

Gallery

References

External links

 Delineation of area of existing village Lin Ma Hang (Sha Tau Kok) for election of resident representative (2019 to 2022)
 Manchester Chinese Community: Lin Ma Hang Yip Clan
 100 Mapping Ling Ma Hang, submitted as part of thesis for Master of Architecture by Yeung Shan Yan, Cindy
 Micro documentary | Shenzhen story behind the cross border farming permit
 Video taken on 5 June 2003 of minibus driving to Lin Ma Hang. The latter part shows the road along the border.

Places in Hong Kong
Sha Tau Kok